Jim Conquest (30 May 1880 – 26 April 1960) was an Australian rules footballer who played with Melbourne in the Victorian Football League (VFL).

Notes

External links 

1880 births
1960 deaths
Australian rules footballers from Melbourne
Melbourne Football Club players
Prahran Football Club players
People from Malvern, Victoria